Tu Kai-wen is a Taiwanese judoka. At the 2012 Summer Olympics he competed in the Men's 66 kg, but was defeated in the second round.

References

1991 births
Taiwanese male judoka
Living people
Olympic judoka of Taiwan
Judoka at the 2012 Summer Olympics
21st-century Taiwanese people